"Au Nom de la rose" is a 1999 song recorded by French singer Moos. The song was released on 13 April 1999 as the second single from his sole album Le Crabe est érotique. It became a smash hit in France and Belgium (Wallonia) where it remained for several months atop of the singles chart.

Song information
The song is a partly cover version in French-language of the Francis Lai song (Where Do I Begin?) Love Story, originally recorded as theme song for the 1970 movie Love Story directed by Arthur Hiller. Only the chorus is similar, and the lyrics are changed and deal with loss and love in a sensual way. The lyrics were written by Moos, and Lai's music reworked by Moos and Pascal Castro.

The song has been added to many French compilations such as Hit Express 8, Hit Connection – Best Of 1999 (released as the time of the song), and Top 50 : 20 ans de tubes Vol. 1 (2007). It has also been included on Hits de diamant, a best of containing big hits in France.

Chart performances
In France, the song debuted at No. 6 on SNEP chart on 17 April 1999. It reached number one three weeks later and stayed there for nine consecutive weeks. It remained for 17 weeks in the top ten, 23 weeks in the top 50 and 29 weeks in the top 100. It achieved Diamond status after about two months and half and was the third best-selling single of 1999.

In Belgium (Wallonia), the song was very successful too: it started at #24 on the Ultratop 40 on 15 May 1999, climbed to #5 and eventually topped the chart for eight weeks, before dropping. It totaled 14 weeks in the top ten and 21 weeks in the top 40. The song was ranked No. 2 on the annual chart.

Track listings
 CD single
 "Au Nom de la rose" – 4:20
 "Au Nom de la rose" (instrumental) – 4:20

 CD single
 "Au nom de la rose" – 4:19
 "Qui me donnera des ailes" – 4:18

 7" single
 "Au Nom de la rose" – 4:20

Charts

Certifications

References

1999 singles
Moos (singer) songs
Ultratop 50 Singles (Wallonia) number-one singles
SNEP Top Singles number-one singles
Songs with music by Francis Lai
1999 songs